Harley Orrin "Buckey" Staggers Jr. (born February 22, 1951) is an American politician and lawyer from West Virginia. He served five terms as a Democrat in the United States House of Representatives.

Life and career
Staggers was born in Washington, D.C. His father, Harley Staggers Sr., was a Democratic Congressman from West Virginia from 1949 until 1981, when he declined to run for a seventeenth term.

Staggers, Jr. graduated from Harvard University and the West Virginia University College of Law. He served as an assistant West Virginia Attorney General before serving one term in the West Virginia Senate.

After Republican successor, Cleve Benedict, gave up his seat after one term to run against Senator Robert Byrd, Harley Staggers Jr. ran for the seat and won. He was reelected four more times, defeating Oliver Luck in his fourth re-election.

Harley Staggers Jr. lost his seat after West Virginia lost one congressional seat following the 1990 Census. Most of his former 2nd District's territory was merged with the Charleston-based 3rd District of fellow Democrat Bob Wise to form a new . Staggers opted to challenge Mollohan in the Democratic primary and was defeated.

Staggers currently practices law in Keyser, West Virginia.

Personal life
He married Leslie R. Sergy in 1986. They have three children. His son Harley O. Staggers III is also a lawyer.

Notes

External links

1951 births
Harvard University alumni
Living people
People from Keyser, West Virginia
People from Washington, D.C.
Potomac State College alumni
Staggers family of West Virginia
West Virginia lawyers
Democratic Party West Virginia state senators
West Virginia University College of Law alumni
Democratic Party members of the United States House of Representatives from West Virginia